Tim Shea Falls is a waterfall on Tim Shea Creek, a tributary of the Burnett River, in Queensland, Australia. The waterfall is located within the Bunya Mountains National Park, in the South Burnett Region, near the village of Dandabah in the Bunya Mountains. Like other waterfalls in the area, Tim Shea Falls is surrounded by dense bush and pine forest.

Access
The falls are easily accessed by a two kilometre maintained walking track from Dandabah, the track is unsuitable for wheelchairs and bicycles, but is quite easy on foot.

See also

List of waterfalls of Australia

References

Waterfalls of Queensland
South Burnett Region